Mombaldone is a comune (municipality) in the Province of Asti in the Italian region Piedmont, located about  southeast of Turin and about  southeast of Asti.

References

External links
 Official website

Cities and towns in Piedmont